phpSQLiteAdmin is a name of two independent web applications, written in PHP, for managing SQLite databases.

phpSQLiteAdmin is a web-based client which leverages PHP scripting and the SQLite file-database system to provide a simple way for users to create databases, create tables, and query their own data using non-industry-standard SQLite syntax.

External links
 (inactive since Nov 2009)
 (inactive since Dec 2006)
 (actively developed alternative)

Free software programmed in PHP
Database administration tools